Peoria Township may refer to:

 City of Peoria Township, Peoria County, Illinois
 West Peoria Township, Peoria County, Illinois, originally Peoria Township
 Peoria Township, Franklin County, Kansas
 Peoria Township, Knox County, Nebraska

Township name disambiguation pages